Neil James Allison (11 October 1912 – 21 October 1962) was an Australian rules footballer who played with Hawthorn in the Victorian Football League (VFL).

Family
The son of James Neil Allison (1890–1913), and Elsie Grace Allison, née Coleman, Neil James Allison was born in Carlton, Victoria on 11 October 1912. He married Olive "Bub" Burnett in 1940. They had one son, Patrick.

Football
He played with Hawthorn in the Victorian Football League (VFL). In 1939 he applied for a clearance to Coburg Football Club in the VFA.

Military service
He enlisted in the Second AIF in June 1940.

Death
He died as a result of the injuries sustained in an accident on 21 October 1962, when a car in which he was a passenger struck a tree on the Geelong Road, in West Footscray.

Notes

References
 World War Two Nominal Roll: Warrant Officer Class 2 Neil James Allison (VX18998), Department of Veterans' Affairs.

External links 

 Melbourne, Vic. (1 September 1945): Members of Central Provision Office, Master General of the Ordnance Branch (photograph), Collection of the Australian War Memorial: Allison is at extreme left of front row.

1912 births
1962 deaths
Australian rules footballers from Melbourne
Hawthorn Football Club players
Australian Army personnel of World War II
Road incident deaths in Victoria (Australia)
Australian Army soldiers
People from Carlton, Victoria
Military personnel from Melbourne